The Guatemala Health Initiative (GHI) is a private, humanitarian organization that works to improve the health of the impoverished, indigenous population in the remote areas of the Western highlands in Guatemala. It is affiliated with the University of Pennsylvania. Faculty, students, and staff work in partnership to address the health issues of the underprivileged Santiago Atitlán community in Guatemala. The goal of GHI is to strengthen clinical services and promote community health in resource-poor Guatemalan communities.

Background 
Santiago Atitlán is a community of 44,220 Tz'utujil, Mayan language-speaking inhabitants. The community is 98 percent indigenous. The primary language for ninety four percent of the residents is the Tz'utujil language; however, 54% speak Spanish, and 13% read some Spanish. Residents of Santiago Atitlán are referred to as Atitecos. Eighty percent are Catholics, but the traditional Mayan beliefs have endured. 

According to the World Bank, in 2011, Guatemala had one of the most unequal income distributions in the world, with 51% of the population living on less than  a day and 15% on less than  a day. While over half of the population of Guatemala lives in extreme poverty, within the rural indigenous Maya areas of Santiago Atitlán this poverty level rises to 91%.

Guatemala's social development indicators, such as maternal and infant mortality, chronic child-malnutrition, and illiteracy, are among the worst in the hemisphere. Santiago Atitlán has the worst access to health care in Guatemala. This and other indigenous communities in the Guatemalan highlands suffer extremely high rates of maternal and infant mortality with many obstetrical complications, and high levels of pre-eclampsia.

Despite criticism of water chlorination, 90 percent of residents get their drinking water from household or public taps, but many still drink from contaminated sources, or use home-treatment methods on water. Public health water interventions are needed to address factors underlying inequality of access to clean water in order for waterborne diseases to be effectively minimized. In Guatemala, 23 percent of households contain a growth stunted child with an overweight mother. Poor diets were associated with these disparities.

Many Global Health Programs: governmental, non-governmental (NGO), private, and voluntary organizations work to support the people of Guatemala. The World Health Organization (WHO) directs international health activities, supplies training and technical assistance, develops standards, disseminates health information, promotes research, collects and analyzes epidemiologic data, and develops systems for monitoring and evaluating health programs in Guatemala. One of the Global Health Initiatives sponsored by the United States Government, targets women, newborns and children under five in Guatemala. It concentrates support efforts, aligning with NGOs and engaging the private sector in reducing maternal and infant mortality, increasing access to voluntary family planning services, prevention of HIV and other communicable diseases, and improving health systems and health services. In addition to these large organizations, private voluntary organizations contribute twenty percent of the external health aid to distressed areas.

History of GHI
GHI, a voluntary organization, established a partnership with the Hospitalito Atitlán in the summer of 2005, when University of Pennsylvania (Penn) medical and nursing student volunteers conducted a community health assessment in Guatemala. The predecessor to Hospitalito Atitlán, Clínica Santiaguito, opened in the 1960s. The Clinica was abandoned, after the massacre of thirteen Atitecos by the Guatemalan Army in 1990, leaving the town without medical services. I

n 2002, K'aslimaal, a grassroots organization, began to raise funds and make plans to reconstruct the hospital. Hospitalito Atitlán opened on April 1, 2005, providing in-patient, surgical, and 24-hour emergency care to the people of Santiago Atitlán. On October 5, 2005, mudslides triggered by Hurricane Stan buried Hospitalito Atitlán in eight feet of mud. The mud slide destroyed the town and killed hundreds, and the area was declared a mass grave. Two Penn medical students were present during the disaster and participated in the relief efforts. Through the heroism of hospital staff and volunteers, and the generosity of donors, Hospitalito Atitlán, amazingly, re-opened just two weeks later in a temporary location. Groundbreaking for a new permanent building for Hospitalito Atitlán began on September 30, 2006. In November 2010, the first floor of the new hospital opened.

Kent Bream, founding faculty director of the GHI, helped to rebuild the Hospitalito Atitlán that was destroyed in 2005. Bream trains students and coordinates interdisciplinary research, education, and service programming involving the Penn schools of Nursing, Medicine, Arts and Sciences,  Engineering and Applied Science, and the Wharton School to help improve the health of the Atitlán community GHI partners with Hospitalito Atitlán, a small, non-government, non-profit hospital in Santiago Atitlán in the western highlands of Guatemala.
Santiago Atitlán, the largest indigenous village in Central America, sits on the southern shore of Lake Atitlán. The word "atitlán" is a Mayan word that translates as "the place where the rainbow gets its colors".

2011 Update
Hospitalito Atitlán is a health organization in the Atitlán area. Medical care is accessible to all, with a focus on women and children. Social workers, local physicians, nursing, and administrative staff work with volunteer medical personnel. For the many patients that speak only Tz'utujil, Hospitalito Atitlán staff translate Tz'tujil to Spanish.

The mission of GHI is to work with Hospitalito Atitlán to strengthen local medical services in a socially relevant and ethically acceptable way in resource-poor Tz'ulujil Maya community of Santiago Atitlán in Guatemala. GHI collaborates with the Hospitalito Atitlán to improve the health of Atitecos by increasing clinical activities and community health promotion via community health research, personnel, and material support. GHI provides education through video tapes, lectures and community health projects. The initiative provides maternal education on the importance of prenatal care, safe deliveries, and postnatal care. GHI advises the community on the hazards to pulmonary health associated with open cooking fires in homes and the importance of safe drinking water. Central to GHI goals is to putting the knowledge gained through participatory research and clinical and cultural experiences into developing effective, sustainable, and culturally sensitive health interventions.

A number of projects between Penn and its Guatemalan partners are being conducted or explored, including scientific and clinical training with bilateral exchanges of students and faculty, as well as research on issues related to: violence prevention, food and nutrition, road traffic safety, chronic disease and trauma treatment.

In 2011, Bream, students, medical school librarians, and hospital IT specialists brought the Penn mobile technology project to Hospitalito Atitlán. The Penn mobile technology project, a most promising telemedicine program, uses smart phones and other mobile technologies to improve physicians' access to clinical information in Guatemala. The smart phone technology allows images and information to be relayed to Penn doctors for instantaneous diagnosis and second opinions. They can also use electronic devices to tap into extensive electronic medical databases and e-journals to get information on diseases and treatment options. This immediate access to medical information will advance the quality of care in this rural area.

GHI raises funds, procures medical supplies, and provides personnel support for Hospitalito Atitlán. Penn medical and nursing student rotations benefit both Penn and Hospitalito Atitlán. The GHI also informs the Penn community about health and human rights in Guatemala.

References 

Health in Guatemala